Patriot Act: A Jeffrey Ross Home Movie is a 2005 documentary film written and directed by comedian Jeff Ross.

Overview
The film covers a 2003 United Service Organizations (USO) comedy tour for American soldiers in Iraq, organized and headlined by Drew Carey and also featuring Ross, Blake Clark, Rocky LaPorte, Kyle Dunnigan and Kathy Kinney. The film shows the comedians performing for the troops, interacting with them, and observing elements of the ongoing Iraq War. Ross, who had never participated in a USO tour, states in the documentary that he was inspired by comedian Bob Hope, who performed frequently for U.S. troops throughout his life.

Patriot Act premiered at the Montreal Just for Laughs Festival on July 21, 2005, and has since been shown on Showtime.

Awards
Official Selection: 2006 South by Southwest Film Festival

References

External links

eFilm Critic

2005 films
Documentary films about entertainers
2005 comedy films
American documentary films
Stand-up comedy concert films
2000s English-language films
2000s American films